Achraf Hakimi Mouh (born 4 November 1998) is a professional footballer who plays for Ligue 1 club Paris Saint-Germain and the Morocco national team. He mainly plays as a right-back, He can play in the left-back and winger positions.

Hakimi came through Real Madrid's youth academy. He began playing for Real Madrid Castilla in 2016 and was promoted to the first-team in 2017. He was sent on a two-year loan deal to Bundesliga side Borussia Dortmund, winning the DFL-Supercup in 2019. He then signed with Serie A side Inter Milan for a reported fee of €40 million, helping the club win the 2020–21 Serie A title, their first in 11 years. Paris Saint-Germain then signed him in 2021 for a reported fee of €60 million.

Born in Spain to parents from Morocco, Hakimi  was capped by Morocco at under-20 level, before making his senior international debut in 2016 aged 17. He was chosen in Morocco's squads for the FIFA World Cup in 2018 and 2022, and the Africa Cup of Nations in 2019 and 2021.

Early life
Born in Madrid, Spain, to Moroccan parents, Hakimi joined Real Madrid's youth setup in 2006 from Colonia Ofigevi, aged eight.

Club career

Real Madrid

Hakimi made his debut for Real Madrid in the first match of the 2016 International Champions Cup, a 3–1 loss against Paris Saint-Germain. He subsequently returned to the B team, making his senior debut on 20 August 2016 by starting in a 3–2 Segunda División B home win against Real Sociedad B.

Hakimi scored his first senior goal on 25 September 2016, netting the equalizer in a 1–1 draw at Fuenlabrada. 

On 19 August 2017, Hakimi was promoted to the main squad as a backup to Dani Carvajal and Nacho, and was assigned the number 19 jersey. He made his first team – and La Liga – debut on 1 October, starting in a 2–0 home win over Espanyol. He scored his first La Liga goal on 9 December 2017 in a 5–0 win against Sevilla. On 12 May 2018, he scored his second goal against Celta Vigo in a 6–0 win. In the 2017–18 UEFA Champions League, he made two appearances as Madrid won the title, their third consecutive and 13th overall, becoming the first Moroccan player to win the Champions League.

Loan to Borussia Dortmund
On 11 July 2018, Hakimi signed for Bundesliga club Borussia Dortmund on a two-year loan deal. He scored his first goal for the club in a 7–0 victory over 1. FC Nürnberg on 27 September. He provided three assists in a single match for the first time in his career against Atlético Madrid, in his first Champions League appearance for Dortmund. Hakimi scored a brace against Slavia Prague in the group stage of the Champions League on 2 October 2019, his first goals in the competition. On 5 November 2019, Hakimi scored another brace in the second half to turn a 2–0 defeat against Inter Milan to a 3–2 win at the Westfalenstadion.

In February 2020, Hakimi set a Bundesliga speed record when he was clocked at 36.48 km/h (22.67 mph) in a match against Union Berlin, beating the old league record which he had set against RB Leipzig three months prior at 36.2 km/h (22.5 mph). On 31 May, he scored in the club's 6–1 away win over SC Paderborn. After scoring his goal, he removed his shirt to reveal a shirt with the message "Justice for George Floyd". His teammate, Jadon Sancho, revealed a similar shirt after scoring as well.

Inter Milan
On 2 July 2020, Hakimi signed for Serie A club Inter Milan on a five-year contract, with a reported fee of around €40 million. He made his debut on 26 September and provided an assist in a 4–3 win against Fiorentina in the Serie A. He scored his first goal for the club in the subsequent league game against Benevento, which Inter won 5–2.

Paris Saint-Germain
Hakimi signed for Ligue 1 club Paris Saint-Germain (PSG) on 6 July 2021 on a five-year contract. The transfer fee paid by PSG was reported by The Guardian to be an initial €60 million, potentially rising by €11 million in add-ons. Hakimi made his Ligue 1 debut on 7 August, playing the entire ninety minutes and scoring his first goal for the club against Troyes. He received his first red card in a 0–0 draw against Marseille on 24 August. On 22 September, Hakimi scored twice in a 2–1 victory against Metz. In his first season at PSG, he won a Ligue 1 title, his second league title in a row.

On 14 February 2023, Hakimi was nominated for the 2022 FIFA FIFPRO World 11.

International career

After representing Morocco at under-17 and under-20 levels, Hakimi made his debut for the under-23s on 5 June 2016, in a 1–0 friendly win over Cameroon U23s. He made his full international debut on 11 October 2016, coming on as a substitute for Fouad Chafik in a 4–0 win against Canada. He scored his first international goal on 1 September 2017, netting the fourth in a 6–0 home routing of Mali.

In May 2018, he was named in Morocco's preliminary squad for the 2018 FIFA World Cup and on 4 June he was named in the final 23-man squad for the summer tournament.

Hakimi was also called up for the 2021 Africa Cup of Nations in Cameroon. He started all of his matches in the group stages. He scored a free kick in a 2-2 tie against Gabon. He started in the round of 16 against Malawi, scoring a free kick in the 70th minute to grant his team the victory.

On 10 November 2022, Hakimi was named in Morocco's 26-man squad for the 2022 FIFA World Cup in Qatar. He scored the winning goal in a penalty shoot-out against Spain in the round of 16, securing a place for his country in the quarter-finals.

Style of play
Upon signing for Borussia Dortmund, Hakimi was profiled as a quick, dynamic and powerful right-sided attacking full-back or wing-back, who is tactically and technically adept and capable of playing long accurate passes from defence. Trained as a winger, he can also play as a defender due to his physical presence.

Personal life
Hakimi is married to Spanish actress Hiba Abouk; she is of Libyan and Tunisian descent. The couple have two sons, born in 2020 and 2022. Hakimi is a practicing Muslim.

Rape allegations
On 3 March 2023, Hakimi was indicted by an investigating judge in Paris over an allegation of rape, and placed under judicial supervision. He was banned from contacting his alleged victim but allowed to leave French territory.

Career statistics

Club

International

Morocco score listed first, score column indicates score after each Hakimi goal

Honours
Real Madrid Castilla
 Copa del Rey Juvenil: 2017

Real Madrid
UEFA Champions League: 2017–18
UEFA Super Cup: 2017
FIFA Club World Cup: 2017
Supercopa de España: 2017

Borussia Dortmund
DFL-Supercup: 2019

Inter Milan
Serie A: 2020–21

Paris Saint-Germain
 Ligue 1: 2021–22
 Trophée des Champions: 2022

Individual
CAF Youth Player of the Year: 2018, 2019
Bundesliga Rookie of the Month: September 2018, November 2018, December 2019
Bundesliga Team of the Year: 2019–20
Lion d'Or African Footballer of the Year: 2019
UEFA Champions League Breakthrough XI: 2019
Globe Soccer Awards Best Young Arab Player of the Year: 2019
Joy Awards Arab Sportsman of the Year: 2022
Goal Africa Team of the Year: 2018, 2019
France Football Africa Team of The Year: 2018,2019,2020,2021
CAF Team of the Year: 2019
ESM Team of the Year: 2021
IFFHS All-time Morocco Men's Dream Team
IFFHS Africa Team of The Year: 2020, 2021, 2022
IFFHS Men's World Team: 2021, 2022
Africa Cup of Nations Team of The Tournament: 2021
Serie A Team of the Year: 2020–21
FIFA FIFPRO World 11: 2022
Best Moroccan player abroad: 2020–21, 2021–22

Orders
Order of the Throne: 2022

References

External links

 Profile at the Paris Saint-Germain website
 
 
 

1998 births
Living people
Footballers from Madrid
Moroccan Muslims
Spanish Muslims
Moroccan footballers
Spanish footballers
Association football defenders
Association football wingers
Association football utility players
CD Colonia Ofigevi players
Real Madrid Castilla footballers
Real Madrid CF players
Borussia Dortmund players
Inter Milan players
Paris Saint-Germain F.C. players
Segunda División B players
La Liga players
Bundesliga players
Serie A players
Morocco youth international footballers
Morocco international footballers
2018 FIFA World Cup players
2019 Africa Cup of Nations players
2021 Africa Cup of Nations players
2022 FIFA World Cup players
Moroccan expatriate footballers
Spanish expatriate footballers
Expatriate footballers in France
Expatriate footballers in Germany
Expatriate footballers in Italy
Moroccan expatriate sportspeople in France
Moroccan expatriate sportspeople in Germany
Moroccan expatriate sportspeople in Italy
Spanish expatriate sportspeople in France
Spanish expatriate sportspeople in Germany
Spanish expatriate sportspeople in Italy